Antsahana is a town and commune in Madagascar. It belongs to the district of Maroantsetra, which is a part of Analanjirofo Region.

Primary and junior level secondary education are available in town. The majority 85% of the population of the commune are farmers.  The most important crops are rice and vanilla, while other important agricultural products are coffee and cloves.  Services provide employment for 10% of the population. Additionally fishing employs 5% of the population.

References and notes 

Populated places in Analanjirofo